
The Iguazu River, also called Rio Iguassu, is a river in Brazil and Argentina. It is an important tributary of the Paraná River.

Course

The Iguazu originates in the Serra do Mar coastal mountains of the Brazilian state of Paraná and close to Curitiba.
For , to its confluence with the San Antonio River, the Iguazu flows west through Paraná State, Brazil. Downriver from the confluence, the Iguazu River forms the boundary between Brazil and Argentina's Misiones Province. Continuing west, the river drops off a plateau, forming Iguazu Falls, which are accessible via the Rainforest Ecological Train. The falls are within national parks in both Brazil, Iguaçu National Park, and Argentina, Iguazú National Park. It empties into the Paraná River at the point where the borders of Argentina, Brazil, and Paraguay join, an area known as the Triple Frontier.

Ecology
Unlike tropical South American rivers, where the annual variations in temperature are relatively limited, the water in the subtropical Iguazu River varies significantly depending on season. The pH is typically near-neutral, ranging from 5.9 to 8.7.

About 100 fish species are native to the Iguazu River, and several undescribed species are known. Most fish species in the river are catfish, characiforms and cichlids. About 70% are endemic, which to a large extent is linked to the falls, serving both as a home for rheophilic species and isolating species above and below. This also means that, except for the threatened Steindachneridion melanodermatum in the lower part, large migratory fish known from much of the Paraná River Basin are naturally absent from Iguazu. Almost 30  introduced species are found in the river where about one-third originate from other continents (such as carp, largemouth bass,  tilapia and African sharptooth catfish) and the remaining from elsewhere in South America (such as  dorado, Cichla kelberi, pacu, Brycon hilarii, Prochilodus lineatus and Odontesthes bonariensis).

The unusual Aegla crustacean are locally common in the Iguazu River Basin.

Environmental issues

See also
 List of rivers of Argentina
 List of rivers of Brazil

References

Rivers of Argentina
Rivers of Brazil
Tributaries of the Paraná River
International rivers of South America
Rivers of Paraná (state)
Rivers of Misiones Province
Foz do Iguaçu
Border rivers
Argentina–Brazil border